Pimlico is an inner city area of Dublin, Ireland on the southside in Dublin 8. It lies between Thomas Court and Ardee Street. At the Thomas Court end of Pimlico is Pimlico Cottages. It is close to the St. James's Gate Guinness Brewery. Similar to other areas of Dublin's Liberties, such as The Coombe, Pimlico was historically home to families of  weavers.

In music
The area is mentioned in The Banks of Pimlico, a 19th century music hall song. Other songs associated with Pimlico include Pete St John's Dublin in the Rare Old Times. Recorded by artists including Dublin City Ramblers, The Dubliners, and Flogging Molly, the song is sung in the voice of one Sean Dempsey, "born hard and late in Pimlico, in a house that ceased to be".

References

Places in Dublin (city)